Poetic Justice is a 1993 American romantic drama film written and directed by John Singleton and starring Janet Jackson and Tupac Shakur with Regina King and Joe Torry in supporting roles. Poetic Justice follows Justice (Jackson), a poet mourning the loss of her boyfriend from gun violence, who goes on a road trip from South Central L.A. to Oakland on a mail truck along with her friend (King) and a postal worker (Shakur) who she initially cannot stand but soon helps Justice deal with her depression.

Following the success of his debut film, Boyz n the Hood, Singleton wanted to make a film that would give a voice to young African-American women. Jada Pinkett, Lisa Bonet, Monica Calhoun and many other popular actresses auditioned for the role of Justice, though Singleton knew from the script's draft that the role was solely intended for Janet Jackson. Filming took place from April 14 to July 4, 1992.

Poetic Justice was released in the United States on July 23, 1993. The film received mixed reviews from critics, who criticized the screenplay though praised Jackson and Shakur's performances and chemistry. It reached No. 1 in the box office its opening weekend, grossing $11,728,455. It eventually grossed a total of $27,515,786. Jackson received Academy Award and Golden Globe nominations for Best Original Song for "Again", which also reached number one on the Billboard Hot 100. The film has developed a cult following, especially for the chemistry between Jackson and Shakur.

Plot

Justice is a young African American woman living in South Central, Los Angeles, named by her late mother who gave birth to her while attending law school. After the fatal shooting of her boyfriend Markell, Justice becomes deeply depressed, spending most of her time with her cat named Whiteboy in the house that she inherited from her grandmother, and only going out to her job at a local hair salon. A talented poet, Justice reads many of her poems throughout the film, both to other characters and in voice-over.

While she is working at the salon one day, a young postal clerk named Lucky arrives and begins flirting with her. She and her female boss Jessie rebuff his advances, pretending to be lesbians and mocking Lucky with their "relationship".

Lucky has also suffered tragedy in his life: his main focus is caring for his young daughter Keisha, whom he had to forcibly remove from the care of her crack-addicted mother (nicknamed "Angel"), who was using drugs and having sex with her drug dealer while leaving the child unattended in the apartment. Lucky dreams of a professional career in music and shows considerable promise, but insists that his cousin is the true talent.

Justice's friend Iesha manages to talk Justice into taking a road trip to Oakland with Iesha's boyfriend, Chicago, Lucky's co-worker at the post office. Justice warily accepts, mainly because she has to go to Oakland for a hair show and her car had stopped working at the last minute. Unbeknownst to Justice, Lucky is also on the trip, and she will now be sharing a postal van with him and their two mutual friends. Initially, they argue, but they soften towards each other as they gradually discover their similarities.

The quartet makes a couple of detours: the first is a family reunion barbecue they see signs for on the road, where it becomes apparent (although there were ample hints earlier) that Iesha and Chicago's relationship is troubled. Iesha openly flirts with another man at the barbecue, while Chicago broods watching her behavior. Iesha and Chicago argue in the mail truck until Justice talks to Iesha about her behavior with alcohol. Iesha throws up and tearfully apologizes to her.

At the next stop, a carnival, Lucky and Justice grow closer while discussing their lives. After leaving the reunion, they stop at a beach where each of the four contemplates their separate situations in internal monologues. Afterward, the friction between Chicago and Iesha explodes when Iesha informs Chicago that she has been seeing someone on the side, and he physically attacks her. Lucky initially decides to abstain until Justice defends Iesha by kicking Chicago in the groin, who retaliates by physically and brutally attacking her. Lucky knocks Chicago out, and he, Justice and a bleeding and shaken Iesha leave him behind and continue on their journey.

Lucky stops the postal van at a beach, and Justice goes to see what's wrong. She begins opening up to him about her life, and Lucky becomes sympathetic. They share a kiss, and Justice walks away apparently unsure of her feelings for Lucky. She goes back to him, and they kiss again.

When the now-trio arrive in Oakland, they receive news that Lucky's cousin, with whom he had been working on recording music, has been killed. Blaming himself for not being in Oakland sooner and believing he could have prevented the shooting had he been in town, Lucky angrily blames Justice for distracting him while they were on the road. Jessie advises Justice and Iesha about men before the hair show. Lucky's uncle and aunt give him his cousin's recording equipment. Lucky decides to give up work and take care of Keisha.

Months later, Lucky meets up with Justice again back at the hair salon, bringing Keisha. Remorseful over his conduct in Oakland and his cruel words towards Justice there, he apologizes. She smiles at him coyly and they passionately kiss. She then turns her attention to Keisha, fussing over her hair. Justice and Lucky's eyes meet over Keisha's head and they smile, as strongly connected as ever.

Cast
 Janet Jackson as Justice, a poet
 Tupac Shakur as Lawrence "Lucky", a postal clerk
 Regina King as Iesha, Justice's friend
 Joe Torry as "Chicago"
 Tyra Ferrell as Jessie
 Rose Weaver as Aunt Audrey
 Billy Zane as Brad (Opening Movie)
 Lori Petty as Penelope (Opening Movie)
 Khandi Alexander as Simone
 John Cothran Jr. as Uncle Earl
 Maya Angelou as Aunt June
 Norma Donaldson as Aunt May
 Jenifer Lewis as Anne, Lucky's Mother
 Maia Campbell as Shante
 René Elizondo Jr. as Earl
 Clifton Collins Jr. as Kareem LaVine
 Tone Loc as James Paul
 Q-Tip as Markell, Justice's boyfriend
 Keith Washington as Dexter
 Roger Guenveur Smith as Heywood
 Michael Colyar as Panhandler
 The Last Poets as themselves

Production
On July 23, 2013, John Singleton spoke with writer Lathleen Ade-Brown for Essence magazine and discussed the 20th anniversary of the film. The interview mentioned that in 1993, black female leads were rare and he wanted to give a voice to young African American women. He also revealed whose idea it was for Janet Jackson to wear the now iconic box braids: "That was a collaboration between myself, Janet, [dance choreographer] Fatima Robinson and dancer named Jossie Harris. Jossie had the braids in Michael Jackson’s "Remember the Time" video. I brought her and Fatima and a couple of other dancers over to hang out with Janet and they all became friends. I said, "Why don't we try and do Janet's hair like Jossie's hair?" We got the hairstyle from Harlem and just put it in a West Coast movie.".

Jada Pinkett, Lisa Bonet, Monica Calhoun and many other popular actresses auditioned for the role of Justice, though Singleton knew from the script's draft that the role was solely intended for Janet Jackson. Rapper and actor Ice Cube was offered the lead role of Lucky, but turned it down, stating that he was not in a point in his career that he would play in romantic movies. Filming began on April 14th, 1992 and ended on July 4th, 1992.

Release
The film opened July 23, 1993 in the United States. Cineplex Odeon initially decided not to release the film at its Universal CityWalk Hollywood theater due to fear of violence. Rita Walters called Cineplex Odeon's decision racist and they agreed to delay the release until July 28. Around the country, five violent incidents occurred around theaters during the film's opening weekend, including a killing outside a Las Vegas theater.

Reception

Box office
Poetic Justice made $27,515,786 in the domestic box office, against a production budget of $14 million. For its opening weekend it opened at number one at the US box office with over $11,700,000 in ticket sales. It ranked 20th for the year of 1993 openings and 21st for highest R-rated movies of 1993.

Critical reception
Upon its release, Poetic Justice received mostly negative reviews with most critics comparing it unfavorably to Singleton's debut film Boyz n the Hood. Much of the acclaim was directed to the performances by both Jackson and Shakur, with criticism stemming from the writing and story line. On Rotten Tomatoes the film has a 34% rating based on 32 reviews. The site's consensus states; "Poetic Justice is commendably ambitious and boasts a pair of appealing stars, but they're undermined by writer-director John Singleton's frustrating lack of discipline." On Metacritic the film has a score of 51% based on reviews from 21 critics, indicating "mixed or average reviews". Audiences surveyed by CinemaScore gave the film a grade "B+" on scale of A to F.

Roger Ebert: "...Boyz n the Hood was one of the most powerful and influential films of its time, in 1991. "Poetic Justice" is not its equal, but does not aspire to be; it is a softer, gentler film, more of a romance than a commentary on social conditions." He also stated, "...Poetic Justice unwinds like a road picture from the early 1970s, in which the characters are introduced and then set off on a trip that becomes a journey of discovery. By the end of the film, Justice will have learned to trust and love again, and Shakur will have learned how to listen to a woman. And all of the characters - who in one way or another lack families - will begin to get a feeling for the larger African/American family to which they belong. The scene where that takes place is one of the best in the film." Leonard Klady of Variety stated: "Though aiming to create a feel for the locale, Singleton periodically loses sight of audiences unfamiliar with the colorful lingo. Poetic Justice has a lot to commend, but discipline is not high on the list. That flaw will be a major stumbling block toward wide appeal, and overseas prospects seem particularly remote." Kenneth Turan of the Los Angeles Times called the film "a disappointement" but praised Singleton for his skills and suggested "A filmmaker who is adept at saying what’s on his mind, he will do better when he finds something he truly wants to say." Peter Travers of Rolling Stone criticized the film for "wrong turns and right-minded preachiness" but praised the young director saying: "If Singleton, 25, stumbles, it is over ambition and not the complacency of a new Hollywood hotshot riding a trend." Vincent Canby of The New York Times wrote: "Although its aspirations are high, the film works only fitfully when Mr. Singleton exercises his gift for vernacular speech, for finding the comic undertow in otherwise tragic situations, and even for parody." Owen Gleiberman of Entertainment Weekly gave it a C- grade. Richard Schickel of Time panned the film "What must be said is that the new movie is simply awful: poorly structured, vulgarly written, insipidly directed, monotonously performed."

Despite the mixed reviews from contemporary film critics, the film has come to be considered one of Singleton's most enduring films.

Accolades

Soundtrack

The soundtrack album was released on June 29, 1993 through Epic Soundtrax, and consisted of a blend of hip hop and R&B music. It peaked at number 23 on the Billboard 200 chart in the United States and was certified Gold by the Recording Industry Association of America on August 25, 1993. Three charting singles were released from the album: "Indo Smoke" by Mista Grimm, "Get It Up" by TLC, and "Call Me a Mack" by Usher Raymond. Recorded at Unique Recording Studios, New York City

The soundtrack also has the Stevie Wonder song "Never Dreamed You'd Leave in Summer", a track that was originally on his 1970 album Where I'm Coming From. The song "Definition of a Thug Nigga", recorded by Tupac Shakur for the film, later appeared on his 1997 posthumous album R U Still Down? (Remember Me).

References

External links
 
 
 
 Original Poetic Justice Script
 Poetic Justice at the Open Media Database
 VH1 Clips, Trailer and more 

1993 films
1993 LGBT-related films
1993 romantic drama films
African-American romantic drama films
Columbia Pictures films
Films scored by Stanley Clarke
Films about writers
Films directed by John Singleton
Films set in Los Angeles
Films set in Oakland, California
Golden Raspberry Award winning films
American gang films
Hood films
Lesbian-related films
Films with screenplays by John Singleton
Works about poets
1990s English-language films
1990s American films
African-American films